John Adams High School (often referred to simply as Adams) is a public high school in South Bend, Indiana.

Location
The campus is located between the historic River Park and Sunnymede neighborhoods in South Bend, Indiana. The neighborhood is on the east side of town, and Adams is referred to as "The Pride of the East Side".

School Field, the home stadium for Adams football, is on the other side of the Sunnymede neighborhood, next to Jefferson Intermediate School.

History
John Adams High School opened on September 30, 1940 as part of a program sponsored by the Federal Works Agency and the Public Works Administration. The school opened late due to the polio epidemic of the 1930s. The school auditorium was once the only large performing stage in South Bend. It has been the site of many historical events and performers such as the premiere screening of Knute Rockne, All American, concerts by Kate Smith, Ezio Pinza and the Chicago Symphony Orchestra, a taping of The Fred Waring Show and a speech by John Wooden.

Selected scenes from the movie Rudy were filmed in John Adams High School.

The school's 2008-2009 enrollment was approximately 2000, which made it the second largest high school in the South Bend metropolitan area. The mock trial team at Adams won two national titles, in 2009 and 2011, as well as 16 state titles, making it the most successful competitive high school mock trial program in state history.

State and national recognition

John Adams Athletics has a total of 27 Indiana State Championships and 2 National Championships.

Seven sports have won state championships, and the mock trial program has won two national championships.

In 1966, the football team was ranked 3rd in Indiana State Rankings and 9th Nationally. In the 1972-1973 season, the boys basketball team finished 2nd in Indiana state tournament. In the 1978-1979 season, the boys basketball team was ranked 1st in every Indiana regular season poll.

In 2012 and 2013 Adams began to grow as an athletic power. In 2012, the basketball team won a sectional title and defeated the Lake Central Indians, led by future Michigan star Glenn Robinson, Jr in the regional semifinals. The following school year The football team, coached by Craig Redman, compiled a 9-3 record, equaling the school record for wins. Coach Redman won conference coach of the year in football, as well as wrestling. The Basketball team again won a sectional title. Along the way they defeated Penn, Mishawaka Marian, and New Haven, all teams who had players committed to play basketball at Notre Dame.

Fine arts

John Adams Orchestra 
The  John Adams High School Orchestra is currently under the direction of Jaesung Lee.

Under the direction of Kathleen Kohn, the orchestra sends ensembles and soloists to compete at the Indiana State School Music Association (ISSMA) competition, earning several golds each year.

John Adams Choir 
The  John Adams High School Choir is currently under the direction of Heather Durcharme.

Show choir, under the direction of Dr. Donald Moley (often simply known as “Doc”, is a popular corse at Adams. nearly all performers receive a gold or gold with distinction in the ISSMA choral festival. They consistently perform in group I, the top group in ISSMA competitions.

John Adams Band  
The John Adams High School Band is currently under the direction of Kevin Graham as Head Director and Emily Pantelleria as Assisstant Director (source: https://adams.sb.school/departments/music).

Marching Band 
The John Adams Eagle Marching Band performed at Open Class ISSMA regionals in 1996, 2006-2010. 

In 2007 the band received a gold rating with a score 70.85, the highest score in South Bend history. 

The Eagle Marching Band performed at Walt Disney World Magic Music Days in Orlando, Florida for Spring Break in 1998, 2000, and 2005. 

In 2022, with the 2022 show entitled "Tempus", the John Adams Marching Band received a Gold rating at their ISSMA Preliminaries with a score of 60.6 and went to the Scholastic State Finals, which was the first time in 8 years since the last time the marching band went to state in 2014. 

At the 2022 Scholastic State finals, the marching band received a score of 62.5.

Concert Band 
The John Adams Symphonic Winds and Concert Bands participate every year at the ISSMA Organizational Contest and every year sends performers to the ISSMA State Solo and Ensemble Competition.

Jazz Band 
In 2007, the Jazz Ensemble went to New York for Spring Break. 

In addition, the two jazz bands at Adams are well known locally for their performances, such as Big Band Bash and Jazz Soundsations, and they participate in state competitions such as the Ball State, Purdue and Western Michigan University Jazz Festivals. Dawn Forsythe - Band Director 1996-2010.

Academics
 Nevin Longenecker created the Science Research program at John Adams High School to further the education of students with a predisposition for science.  Over the years Adams students have garnered grants and awards totaling over two million dollars. Recent awards include the two winners of the Indiana Academy of Science State Competition. Also, in 2010, the program produced an Intel Science Talent Search finalist.
 Under the leadership of Rosemary Hess, the school had been approved as an International Baccalaureate (IB) certified school. The present IB program coordinator is Beckie Hernandez.
 Colleges attended by recent valedictorians have included Indiana University Bloomington, University of Notre Dame, University of Chicago, Princeton University, Harvard College, Stanford University, University of California, Berkeley, Georgetown University and Yale University.

IB Program
John Adams began offering the IB Program in May, 2006. Adams was the first inner-city school to offer the program, and remains the only South Bend high school to do so. The IB two-year program is among the most rigorous academic programs of study available to high school students.
IB test scores for Adams students in 2009 were above the world average in 6 out of the 10 tests.

Budget cuts proposed in early 2010 by the South Bend Community School Corporation that would have raised the cost to families of some IB testing fees were reduced or eliminated in March 2010.

Notable alumni
Gita Pullapilly is a Hollywood film director, screenwriter, and producer. Nominated for an Emmy; Guggenheim Fellow. Co-wrote and co-directed the comedy, Queenpins, starring Kristen Bell, Vince Vaughn, Paul Walter Hauser, and Kirby Howell Baptiste.  
Danny Pinter played for Ball State Cardinals football (2015-2019) and 5th Round pick Offensive guard for the Indianapolis Colts.
Anthony Johnson (1986) -  former NFL running back for Jacksonville Jaguars (2000), Carolina Panthers (1995–1999), Chicago Bears (1995), New York Jets (1994) and Indianapolis Colts (1990-1993); played for Notre Dame Fighting Irish football team (1986-1989).
Tom Ehlers (1970) - former NFL linebacker for Philadelphia Eagles (1975-1977) and Buffalo Bills (1978); played for Kentucky Wildcats football team.
Dan Harrigan (1974) - bronze medalist in men's 200-meter backstroke at 1976 Summer Olympics.
 Randal S. Forbes (1979) - Law Clerk for the Hon. Roger O. Debruler, Justice of Indiana Supreme Court; Judge, Steuben Circuit Court; Appellate Attorney with 27 wins at the United States Court of Appeals for the Seventh Circuit.
Matthew Seitz (2002) - Executive Chef, University of Notre Dame football team. https://www.chefsofnotredame.com/our-chefs

See also
 List of high schools in Indiana

References

External links
 
 School snapshot
 South Bend Community School Corporation listing
 South Bend Alumni Association
 John Adams High School Alumni, South Bend
 southbendalumni.com

Public high schools in Indiana
Education in South Bend, Indiana
Educational institutions established in 1940
Schools in St. Joseph County, Indiana
1940 establishments in Indiana